Stigmella kozlovi is a moth of the family Nepticulidae. It is known from the Russian Far East.

The larvae feed on probably Betula dahurica. They probably mine the leaves of their host plant.

External links
Nepticulidae and Opostegidae of the world

Nepticulidae
Moths of Asia
Moths described in 1984